Ernst Poertgen (25 January 1912 – 30 November 1986) was a German footballer who played for Schwarz-Weiß Essen, 1. FC Nürnberg, Schalke 04, Bonner SC and Wacker München. He also represented the Germany national team, earning three caps between 1935 and 1937 and scoring five goals, including a hat trick in a 7–2 win against Luxembourg in September 1936.

References

External links
 
 
 

1912 births
1986 deaths
Footballers from Essen
German footballers
Association football forwards
Germany international footballers
1. FC Nürnberg players
FC Schalke 04 players
Bonner SC players